Zorro (Spanish for 'Fox') is a fictional character, created by Johnston McCulley.

Zorro may also refer to:

Stories

 The Zorro stories, too numerous to list here, began with The Curse of Capistrano in 1919. A comprehensive bibliography of McCulley’s work, including the Zorro tales, is available in a separate article.

 Zorro (novel), a 2005 novel by Isabel Allende, is a prequel to The Curse of Capistrano.

Films

The Mark of Zorro (1920), a silent film starring Douglas Fairbanks
Don Q Son of Zorro (1925), a silent film starring Fairbanks
The Bold Caballero (1936), starring Robert Livingston 
Zorro Rides Again (1937) a film serial starring John Carroll as a modern descendant of the original Zorro
The Mark of Zorro (1940), a film starring Tyrone Power
Zorro's Black Whip (1944) a film serial starring Linda Stirling
The Mark of Zorro (1974), a television movie starring Frank Langella
Zorro (1975), an Italian/French film starring Alain Delon
Zorro (1975), a Hindi  Indian film starring Rekha
Zorro, The Gay Blade (1981) a comedy film about Zorro starring George Hamilton, in which the character has a gay twin brother
The Mask of Zorro (1998) a film starring Antonio Banderas, Anthony Hopkins, Catherine Zeta-Jones, and Stuart Wilson
The Legend of Zorro (2005) a film sequel to The Mask of Zorro (1998)

Television
Zorro (1957 TV series), a Walt Disney television series
The New Adventures of Zorro (1981 TV series), an animated TV series by Filmation
Zorro (1990 TV series), a television series starring Duncan Regehr
 The Legend of Zorro  (1996 anime series), an anime television series produced by Ashi Productions
The New Adventures of Zorro (1997 TV series), an animated TV series by Warner Bros.
Zorro (Philippines TV series), a short-lived 2009 Philippine version of Zorro starring Richard Gutierrez
Zorro: Generation Z, a 2006 animated TV series
Zorro and Son, a short-lived 1983 sitcom television series
Zorro: La Espada y la Rosa, a 2007 telenovela

Music
"Zorro", a 1958 song by The Chordettes
"Zorro", a song by The Bluetones from their 2002 album Science & Nature
The Zorros, an Australian rock band of the early 1980s
Zorro, (1955-2017), Mexican singer and politician

Zoology
"Zorro", the European Spanish word for "fox" (especially the species Vulpes vulpes)
South American fox (Lycalopex), South American canids that are distinct and not closely related to true foxes

People
João Zorro, 13th-century Portuguese troubadour
Gonzalo García Zorro, 16th-century Spanish conquistador
Zorro David (1923-2008), Filipino actor
Zorro Aguilar (1942-1984), Filipino human rights lawyer
Zoilo Versalles (1939-1995), Cuban Major League Baseball player nicknamed "Zorro"

Other uses
Michigan goal, the U.S. name for an ice hockey shooting technique known as a "Zorro" in Europe
Zorro (1985 video game), a 1985 cross-platform video game
Zorro (1995 video game), a 1995 DOS video game
Roronoa Zoro, character from the manga/anime One Piece
Zorro Productions, Inc., the company that controls the worldwide trademarks and copyrights of the character Zorro

See also
Amiga Zorro II, computer expansion bus
Amiga Zorro III, computer expansion bus
El Zorro (disambiguation)
Zoro (disambiguation)

Surnames from nicknames